Ulrike Schweikert (born 28 November 1966) is a German writer.

Her book series Die Erben der Nacht was adapted to television as Heirs of the Night by Diederik van Rooijen and Maria von Heland.

References 

1966 births
Living people
20th-century German women writers
21st-century German women writers